The list of battleships includes all battleships built between 1859 and 1946, listed alphabetically.

The boundary between ironclads and the first battleships, the so-called 'pre-dreadnought battleship', is not obvious, as the characteristics of the pre-dreadnought evolved in the period from 1875 to 1895.

As they can be considered as reduced versions of battleships, coastal defence ships (sometimes also referred to as coastal defence battleships) are included in the list.

See also

 List of ironclads
 List of battlecruisers
 List of battleships of the Second World War
 List of battleship classes

Sources

External links
 Maritimequest Battleships & Battlecruisers of the 20th century